Kaishin First Junior High School (開進第一中学校, Kaishin Daiichi Chū Gakkō?) is a public junior high school in Hayamiya, Nerima, Tokyo, Japan. The abbreviation is Kaiitchū, and Kaishin Itchū.

history 
 1947
 April 1: Established as Itabashi City Kaishin First Junior High School.
 August 1: Nerima separated from Itabashi and become Nerima City Kaishin First Junior High School.
 May 1, 1948: Establish school song.
 June 27, 1949: Completed the new school building on the present location.
 April 1, 2010: Nerima City Education Committee Curriculum Research Designation
 April 1, 2017: Marked the 70th anniversary of the school opening.

Extracurricular activities

Outside activities 
 Athletics
 Badminton
 Baseball
 Basketball
 Soccer
 Soft tennis
 Table tennis
 Volleyball

Inside activities 
 Art
 Brass band
 Calligraphy
 Cultural research
 Gardening

Traffic access 
 10 minutes on foot from Tokyo Metro Yurakucho Line or Fukutoshin Line Hikawadai Station 1st Exit.
 12 minutes on foot from Tokyo Metro Yurakucho Line or Fukutoshin Line Heiwadai Station South Exit.

Famous people

Gradient 
 Suzue Takayama (former women's volleyball player), Mexican Olympics silver medalist

Faculty and staff 
 Nobutoshi Hagihara (historian), Former teacher

External links 
 Kaishin First Junior High School

Junior high schools in Japan
Schools in Tokyo